South Africa competed at the 2020 Summer Paralympics in Tokyo, Japan, from 24 August to 5 September 2021. The team of 34 athletes competing in seven sports was announced on 14 August 2021, the chef de mission was Leon Fleiser. This was the smallest delegation since the 1992 Summer Paralympics. Except for one gold medal in cycling, all the team's medals, four gold, one silver and two bronze, were won in athletics. Three African and three World records were also set in athletics. South Africa did not enter any team sports.

Medalists

Multiple medallists

The following competitors won several medals at the 2020 Paralympic Games.

Archery 

Two archers, Shaun Anderson (W1) and Philip Coates-Palgrave competed.

Men

|-
|align=left| Shaun Anderson
|align=left|Individual W1
|637
|7
|
|L 123–123 (SO 9-6)
|colspan="4"|did not advance
|-
|align=left|Philip Coates-Palgrave
|align=left|Individual compound open
|646
|36
|W 142–135
|L 130–143
|colspan="4"|did not advance
|}

Athletics 

Eighteen athletes, eleven men and seven women, represented South Africa in athletics: 
Men's track

Men's field

Women's track

Women's field

Cycling 

Three South African cyclists, two men and one woman, competed in road cycling:

Road Events — Women

Road Events — Men

Equestrian 

South Africa entered two equestrian competitors, both women, Philippa Johnson-Dwyer (Grade IV) and Cayla van der Walt (Grade V) for the individual dressage competition.
Individual

Swimming 

Four South African swimmers, two men and two women, competed.

Table tennis

One table tennis player, Theo Cogill (Class10), competed.

Wheelchair tennis

South Africa entered four wheelchair tennis players, two men and two women.

See also 
 South Africa at the Paralympics
 South Africa at the 2020 Summer Olympics

References

External links 
 2020 Summer Paralympics website

Nations at the 2020 Summer Paralympics
2020
Summer Paralympics